This is a list of Albanian photographers.

Photographers from Albania
 Jani Zengo (1832–1913)
 Kristo Sulidhi (1858–1938)
 Kolë Idromeno (1860–1939)
 Mati Kodheli (1862–1881)
 Kel Marubi (1870–1940)
 Geg Marubi (1907–1984)
 Refik Veseli (1926–2000)

Photographers from Kosovo
 Rifo Dobra (1952)
 Burim Myftiu (1961)
 Fadil Berisha (1973)

Photographers from North Macedonia
 Bajazid Doda (1888–1933)
 Mimoza Veliu (1979)

Albanian-American Photographers
 Gjon Mili (1904–1984)
 George Tames (1919–1994)
 Emin Kadi

References

Albanian photographers
Photographers